Bala-Kusary may refer to:
 Bala Qusar, Azerbaijan
 Bala Qusarqışlaq, Azerbaijan